Ulong may refer to: 
 Ulong Island, in the Republic of Palau in the Pacific Ocean, sometimes called Aulong and originally written Oroolong in English
 Ulong channel, a gap in the reef to the west of Ulong Island, popular with divers.
 Ulong, New South Wales, a small town in Australia lying inland from Coffs Harbour.
 Ulong, a tribe in Survivor: Palau, the tenth season, set in Palau, of the American TV series Survivor.
 Ulong is an unsigned long integer datatype in computer programming languages and operating systems
 Ulong tea, an alternate spelling for oolong tea.
 Ulong, a character in the anime franchise Dragon Ball.

See also
 Oolong (disambiguation)